Taraon is a village in the Ghazipur District of Uttar Pradesh, India.

The village of Taraon falls under the jurisdiction of the Taraon Panchayat. It is located  East of Ghazipur, on the border of the Ghazipur and Buxer districts.

Taraon Pin code is 233231 and postal head office is Bhanwarkol.

Taraon is bordered by the Yusufpur Mohammadabad tehsil on the west. It may be reached by rail via the nearby Buxar or Yusufpur Railway Station ( distant).

The local language is Hindi & Bhojpuri.

Villages in Ghazipur district